The Bristol Type 110A  was a single-engine biplane for charter work, accommodating four passengers in comfort. Designed by Frank Barnwell and built at Filton Aerodrome by the Bristol Aeroplane Company. No orders were obtained and only one aircraft was built.

Development
The Bristol 110A was a four-passenger biplane aimed at the charter market, a slightly enlarged version of a projected Type 110 three-passenger aeroplane. It was a single-engine, single-bay biplane that could be powered by one of two smaller relatives of the nine-cylinder Bristol Jupiter radial engine: the five-cylinder, 220 hp (164 kW) Titan or the seven-cylinder 315 hp (235 kW) Neptune. The wings were unswept, unstaggered and of almost equal span, but the lower plane was of much narrower chord than the upper. Frise-type ailerons were fitted only on the upper wing. The Type 110A was an all-metal, fabric-covered aircraft with a flat-sided fuselage, a horn-balanced rudder and an unbraced horizontal tail carrying unbalanced elevators. The passenger cabin, located between the wings, had three windows on each side, one of which was on the starboard side door. The pilot sat high ahead of the leading edge of the upper wing in a glazed cockpit behind the completely cowled engine. The undercarriage was of the divided type, with wide track main wheels and a tailskid.

The Type 110A, registered G-AAFG, first flew with the Titan engine, piloted by Cyril Uwins, on 25 October 1929, after its appearance with a mockup Neptune engine at the Olympia Aero Show in July that year, where its well-appointed cabin impressed visitors but gained no orders. The Neptune was installed in January 1930 and testing proceeded satisfactorily until the aircraft was damaged in a landing accident in early February; as there were no orders in sight, it was decided to abandon the project and the aircraft was scrapped.

Specifications

References
Notes

Bibliography

1920s British civil aircraft
Type 110A